The siege of Salses (1639–1640) was a double siege during the Franco-Spanish War (1635–1659), starting with a French success, but ending with a Spanish victory.

Siege 
On 9 June 1639, a French army of 16,000 men under Henri, Prince of Condé, besieged the castle of Salses held by 600 Spanish, taking it on 19 June. Six weeks later a large Spanish army of 40,000 men, under Filippo Spinola and Francesc de Tamarit appeared and now besieged the French garrison of 2,000 men. 

Condé sent an army of 22,000 men to lift the siege, but suffering from very bad weather, they were defeated in battle by the Spanish on 2 November, with the loss of 3,000 men. Now Salses was alone and hunger forced the French to surrender on 6 January 1640. By then only 800 Frenchmen, of whom 300 were sick, were left. The Spanish army had also lost 10,000 men to disease and desertions.

Consequences 
The presence of a large number of troops in Catalonia contributed to the outbreak of the Catalan Revolt a few months later and the murder of Dalmau de Queralt, Count of Santa Coloma, second in command at the siege of Salses. Salses was retaken by the French after the Fall of Perpignan in September 1642.

References

Sources

External links
 Spanish army at Salses 1639–40

Battles of the Thirty Years' War
Battles involving Spain
Battles involving France
Conflicts in 1639
Conflicts in 1640
History of Catalonia
1639 in Europe
1640 in Europe